Rashid Kibirige Ssebunya  (born 28 March 1993), simply known as Rashy K is a Swedish musical artist, singer, and songwriter.

Music career

Studio albums

Rashy K released his first song  "Nkulage" in 2009. Yenze featuring Buchaman was his first Uganda release. Nuffstyle featuring Yungmulo was his breakthrough song in 2018.

Discography

 Nkulage 2009
 Boom Boom 2012
 Yenze 2013
 Da Love  2015
 It`s a Party 2019
Miss WorldWide 2017
Good Vibes 2018
My Gal 2018
Emunyeenye  2018
Temptation 2019
Onkubye 2018
Nuff Stuff 2018
In My Life  2019
Mu Maaso  2019
I`m Blessed  2020
I`m Ready 2020
East African Girl 2020
Stamina 2020
Best Friend 2020
Beautiful Interlude 2020

Personal life
Rashy K was born in Kampala, he studied from Hilltop Academy, Shimoni Demonstration School but later he was taken to Sweden.

Endorsement
In 2021, Rashy K signed with NBA 2K Sports, an American computer game publisher to use  "I’m Ready" song as a soundtrack in NBA 2021 Next Generation computer game. He also serves as the ambassador of DMG EDUCATION (a music school) in Sweden

Honors

References

External links
Rashy K Biography
Diaspora Singer Rashy K Kills It At “One Love Cruise Europe ” Show In Sweden—Watch Video
Sweden-based Ugandan Rapper Rashy K releases "Bookey" Music Video.
LIVE! RASHY K
Sweden based Ugandan singer, Rashy K scores mega gaming deal
Kulturfest med bredd

1993 births
Living people
21st-century Swedish male singers
People from Kampala
Ugandan emigrants to Sweden